Caspana is a Chilean village located 85 km northeast of the city of Calama, in the gorge carved by the river that shared its name and that is a tributary of the Salado River. Agricultural terraces form part of the landscape of the area. Its church dates from the 17th century.

References
 Sernatur - Caspana

Oases of Chile
Landforms of Antofagasta Region
Populated places in El Loa Province
Rivers of Chile
Canyons and gorges of Chile